Stanley Earl Adams (born May 22, 1960) is a former American football linebacker. He played for the Los Angeles Raiders in 1984.

References

1960 births
Living people
American football linebackers
Memphis Tigers football players
Los Angeles Raiders players